Lemuel F. Vibber House is a historic home located east of the Village of Richfield Springs, New York by Federal Corners, New York. It was built ca. 1810 by Lemuel F. Vibber. The main block of the Vibber House is a side-gabled, two-story, five-bay building on a high stone foundation enclosing a full-height basement built in the Federal style.

It was added to the National Register of Historic Places in 2016.

References

Buildings and structures in Otsego County, New York
National Register of Historic Places in Otsego County, New York
Houses on the National Register of Historic Places in New York (state)
National Register of Historic Places in New York (state)